Polypedates impresus is a species of frogs in the family Rhacophoridae. It is endemic to Yunnan, China, where it has been recorded in Pu'er. It is known from Yunnan (Puer, Lüchun, and Xishuangbanna) and Guangxi (Jingxi County).

References

 Yang, 2008 : Amphibia. in Yang & Rao, 2008 : Amphibia and Reptilia of Yunnan, 
http://research.amnh.org/vz/herpetology/amphibia/Amphibia/Anura/Rhacophoridae/Rhacophorinae/Polypedates/Polypedates-impresus

impresus
Amphibians of China
Frogs of Asia
Amphibians described in 2008